Sanankoroba is a small town and rural commune in the Cercle of Kati in the Koulikoro Region of southern Mali. The commune covers an area of approximately 617 square kilometers and includes the town and 25 villages. In the 2009 census the commune had a population of 37,294. The town lies 34 km south of the Malian capital, Bamako, on the Route Nationale 7 (RN7).

References

External links
.

Communes of Koulikoro Region
Communities on the Niger River